Susan Christine Evans (born August 19, 1993) is an American television personality and former beauty pageant titleholder, who is best known for being the winner of season 26 of The Bachelor. As a beauty pageant titleholder, Evans was crowned Miss Virginia Teen USA 2011 and Miss Virginia USA 2020.

Early life and education 
Evans was born and raised in Poquoson, Virginia, to parents Tom and Jean Evans. She attended Lindenwood University on a full scholarship, graduating in 2015 with a Bachelor of Arts degree in digital cinema arts and broadcast communications.

After graduating from college, Evans was hired as a performer at Tokyo Disneyland, where she portrayed several Disney princesses over the course of two years. While in Japan, Evans became skilled in the art of Jiu-Jitsu, which she continued to train in after returning home to Virginia.

Career 

Evans was previously employed as a program manager for a marketing agency in Williamsburg, Virginia, but left her role in May 2021 to pursue her passion of photography and videography full-time.

Pageantry 

Evans began competing in pageants as a teenager, where she was competed in Miss Virginia Teen USA 2011 representing Fredericksburg and won the title, she then competed in Miss Teen USA 2011, but did not place in the competition. She took a break from pageantry for several years, but returned to compete in Miss Virginia USA 2019 representing Seven Cities, where she placed second runner-up to Miss Georgia Teen USA 2012 Courtney Lynne Smits. She competed in Miss Virginia USA again the following year representing Williamsburg, and was crowned Miss Virginia USA 2020. Miss USA 2020 was originally scheduled for the spring of 2020, the competition was postponed due to the COVID-19 pandemic, and later held on November 9, 2020, but did not place.

Evans crowned her successor, Christina Thompson, in July 2021, becoming the longest reigning titleholder in the state history due to COVID delays.

Reality television

The Bachelor

In September 2021, Evans was revealed as a contestant on season 26 of The Bachelor, starring medical sales representative Clayton Echard. In the final episode, Echard chose Evans, but she rejected him. It was later revealed on the live After the Final Rose special that they had since gotten back together.

Personal life
Evans was in a relationship with Clayton Echard from December 2021 to September 2022.

Filmography

References

External links

1993 births
American beauty pageant winners
American television personalities
American women television personalities
Bachelor Nation contestants
Living people
21st-century Miss Teen USA delegates
People from Poquoson, Virginia
Television personalities from Virginia
Lindenwood University alumni